In number theory, Lochs's theorem concerns the rate of convergence of the continued fraction expansion of a typical real number. A proof of the theorem was published in 1964 by Gustav Lochs.

The theorem states that for almost all real numbers in the interval (0,1), the number of terms m of the number's continued fraction expansion that are required to determine the first n places of the number's decimal expansion behaves asymptotically as follows:

 .

As this limit is only slightly smaller than 1, this can be interpreted as saying that each additional term in the continued fraction representation of a "typical" real number increases the accuracy of the representation by approximately one decimal place.

The reciprocal of this limit,

 ,

is twice the base-10 logarithm of Lévy's constant.

A prominent example of a number not exhibiting this behavior is the golden ratio—sometimes known as the "most irrational" number—whose continued fraction terms are all ones, the smallest possible in canonical form. On average it requires approximately 2.39 continued fraction terms per decimal digit.

References

Continued fractions
Theorems in number theory